National figure skating championships of the 2015–16 season took place mostly between November 2015 and January 2016. Medals were awarded in the disciplines of men's singles, ladies' singles, pair skating, and ice dancing.

Competitions 
Key

Medalists

Men

Ladies

Pairs

Ice dance

References

Nationals
Nationals
Figure skating national championships